Precipitated silica is an amorphous form of silica (silicon dioxide, SiO2); it is a white, powdery material. Precipitated silica is produced by precipitation from a solution containing silicate salts.

The three main classes of amorphous silica are pyrogenic silica,  precipitated silica and silica gel. Among them, precipitated silica has the greatest commercial significance. In 1999, more than one million tons were produced, half of it is used in tires and shoe soles.

Like pyrogenic silica, precipitated silica is essentially not microporous (unless prepared by the Stöber process).

Production
The production of precipitated silica starts with the reaction of a basic silicate solution with a mineral acid. Sulfuric acid and sodium silicate solutions are added simultaneously with agitation to water. Precipitation is carried out under acidic or basic conditions. The choice of agitation, duration of precipitation, the addition rate of reactants, their temperature and concentration and pH can vary the properties of the resulting silica. The formation of a gel stage is avoided by stirring at elevated temperatures.  The resulting white precipitate is filtered, washed and dried in the manufacturing process in order to wash out the produced salts.

 Na2(SiO2)7  +  H2SO4 + O →   7 SiO2  +  Na2SO4  +  H2O
 Na2SiO3 +  H2SO4 →   SiO2  +  Na2SO4  +  H2O

Properties
The particles are porous. Primary structures typically have a diameter of 5 - 100 nm, and specific surface area 5–100 m2/g. Agglomerate size is 1 - 40 µm with average pore size is > 30 nm. Density: 1.9 - 2.1 g/cm3.

Applications
Filler, softener and performance improvement in rubber and plastics
Cleaning, thickening and polishing agent in toothpastes for oral health care
Food processing and pharmaceuticals additive as anti-caking, thickening agent, absorbent to make liquids into powders.
Food rheology modifier
Defoamer

See related companies
 Fujian Sanming Zheng Yuan Chemical Co., Ltd. 
 Anten Chemical Co., Ltd.
 PPG Industries Co.
 Evonik Industries AG
 Pak Chromical Ltd., (PCL)

See also
Colloidal silica
Fumed silica
Hydrophobic silica
Silica gel

References

Silicon dioxide
Plasticizers

ru:Белая сажа